Hampson is an Irish / English surname, and may refer to:

Alfred Hampson (1865–1924), Australian politician
Anne Hampson, British novelist
Art Hampson (born 1947), Former Canadian ice hockey player
Billy Hampson (1882–1966), English football player and manager
Chad Hampson, Antiguan cricketer
Daphne Hampson (born 1944), British theologian
Denis Hampson, Denis Hampsey or Donnchadh Ó Hámsaigh (1695–1807), Irish harper
Frank Hampson (1918–1985), British illustrator
Garrett Hampson (born 1994), American baseball player
Geoff Hampson, American bridge player
George Hampson, (1860–1936), British entomologist
Gord Hampson (born 1959), Canadian hockey player
James K. Hampson (1877–1956), American archaeologist
Jimmy Hampson (1906–1938), English footballer
John Hampson (musician), American guitarist and vocalist
Justin Hampson (born 1980), American baseball player
Keith Hampson (born 1943), British politician
Matt Hampson, English rugby player
Michelle Hampson, American neuroscientist
Norman Hampson (born 1922), English historian
Robert Hampson, English guitarist
Sarah Hampson, Canadian journalist 
Shaun Hampson (born 1988), Australian footballer
Steve Hampson, English rugby player
Stuart Hampson, English executive
Ted Hampson (born 1936), Canadian hockey player
Thomas Hampson (born 1955), American baritone
Tommy Hampson (1907–1965) an English 800 m runner, Olympic champion 1932
Tommy Hampson (footballer), English football player
Walker Hampson (1889–1959), English footballer

See also
Hampson (surname)
Hampson Museum State Park